The Simpson House is a historic house at 57 Hunnewell Avenue in Newton, Massachusetts.  The -story wood-frame house was built in the late 1890s, and is an excellent local example of a well-preserved Queen Anne Victorian with some Colonial Revival features.  It has roughly rectangular massing, but is visually diverse, with a number of gables and projections.  A single story porch across the front extends over the drive to form a porte cochere, and rests on fieldstone piers with Tuscan columns.  The stairs to the entry are called out by a triangular pediment, above which is a Palladian window with flanking columns.  Joseph Simpson, its first owner, was a principal in the Simpson Brothers paving company.

The house was listed on the National Register of Historic Places in 1986.

See also
 National Register of Historic Places listings in Newton, Massachusetts

References

Houses on the National Register of Historic Places in Newton, Massachusetts
Queen Anne architecture in Massachusetts
Colonial Revival architecture in Massachusetts
Houses completed in 1897